Japonica rice (Oryza sativa subsp. japonica), sometimes called sinica rice, is one of the two major domestic types of Asian rice varieties. Japonica rice is extensively cultivated and consumed in East Asia, whereas in most other regions  is the dominant type of rice. Japonica rice originated from Central China, where it was first domesticated along the Yangtze River basin approximately 9,500 to 6,000 years ago.

Characteristics 
Japonica rice grains are rounder, thicker, and harder, compared to longer, thinner, and fluffier indica rice grains. Japonica rice is also stickier due to the higher content of amylopectin, whereas indica rice starch consists of less amylopectin and more amylose. Japonica rice plants are shorter than indica rice plants.

Genetics 
Japonica has a large amount waxy protein and a low amount of the non-waxy type. Non-waxy rice proteins are produced by four alleles, each producing one of four protein subtypes. Japonica is the only source of Type III, shares Type IV with only javanica, and lacks Type I and Type II.

Classification 
Japonica rice can be classified into three subgroups, 'temperate japonica', 'tropical japonica' (also known as 'javanica'), and 'aromatic'. Temperate japonica is cultivated in East Asia (China, Japan, Korea, Vietnam, and Taiwan), while tropical japonica is in Indonesia, Madagascar, and also the Americas where it was brought to with slave trade.

Cultivars 
 Arborio rice
 Bhutanese red rice
 Calrose rice
 Carnaroli
 Koshihikari
 Vialone Nano
 Yamada Nishiki

See also 
 Japanese rice

References 

 
Central China
Crops originating from China
Rice varieties
a